The Puntland Agency For Social Welfare (PASWE) is the state-run social welfare agency of the autonomous Puntland region in northeastern Somalia.

Overview
PASWE was founded in May 2009 in Garowe by the Puntland government. It provides medical, educational and counseling support to vulnerable groups and individuals, such as the disabled, the blind, orphans, and widows of Puntland soldiers.

The agency is overseen by a Board of Directors, which consists of religious scholars (ulema), businesspeople, intellectuals and traditional elders. PASWE is headed by Hussein Mohamed Mohamud, who was appointed to the position by presidential decree on February 7, 2013.

See also
Puntland Development Research Center

Notes

References

External links
Puntland Agency For Social Welfare

Organisations based in Puntland
Social welfare charities
2009 establishments in Somalia
Government agencies established in 2009